Delmer Myers Brown (November 20, 1909November 9, 2011) was an American academic, historian, writer, translator and Japanologist.  He was a professor of Japanese history at the University of California at Berkeley.

Early life, education, and personal life
Brown was born on November 20, 1909 in Harrisonville, Missouri and grew up in Kansas City, Missouri. In 1925, he moved with his family to Santa Ana, California. He attended Santa Ana Junior College and then Stanford University, where he graduated with a degree in history in 1932.

Instead of going to law school, as originally planned, Brown took a position teaching English at a prestigious Japanese Imperial "Higher School" in Kanazawa, Ishikawa, Japan. It was there that he met and married Mary Nelson Logan in 1934.

During World War II, Brown served as an intelligence officer in the U.S. Navy.

Brown earned his Ph.D. in Japanese history from Stanford in 1946.

In 1987, Mary died after 53 years of marriage. Brown was widowed twice more; by Margaret Young Brown in 2003 and Louise K. Weamer in 2010. He is survived by his companion Pauline Howland, two sisters, a son and three step-children, two granddaughters, and six great-grandchildren.

Brown died on November 9, 2011 following a stroke.

Career
From 1946 to 1977, Brown was a member of the faculty of the University of California, Berkeley. He was chairman of the history department from 1957 to 1961 and 1971 to 1975.

Brown was awarded a Fulbright Scholarship in Japan from 1959 to 1960.

In 1998, Brown started the process of establishing the Japanese Historical Text Initiative (JHTI), which is a searchable online database of Japanese historical documents and English translations. It is part of the Center for Japanese Studies at the University of California, Berkeley.  The development of JHTI involved negotiations with the University of Tokyo Press and Japan's National Institute of Japanese Literature.

Selected works
In an overview of writings by and about Brown, OCLC/WorldCat lists roughly 40+ works in 80+ publications in 4 languages and 1,500+ library holdings. 

 Nationalism in Japan: An Introductory Historical Analysis, 1955
 Japan, 1967 
 The future and the Past: A Translation and Study of the Gukanshō, an Interpretative History of Japan Written in 1219 by Jien, 1979
 Chronology of Japan = 日本の歴史, 1987
 An Introduction to Advanced Spoken Japanese, 1987
 The Cambridge History of Japan, Vol. 1, Ancient Japan , 1993

Honors
 Order of the Sacred Treasure, Gold Rays with Neck Ribbon (Japan)

References

1909 births
2011 deaths
People from Harrisonville, Missouri
Historians from Missouri
American Japanologists
American centenarians
Men centenarians
University of California, Berkeley College of Letters and Science faculty
Recipients of the Order of the Sacred Treasure
Historians from California